The Cessna Model EC-2 was a 1930s American two-seat tourer built by the Cessna Aircraft Company.

Design and development
Cessna Aircraft was suffering in the depression and downturn in the economy following the Wall Street crash. Eldon Cessna, the son of Clyde Cessna designed a low-cost, cheap-to-operate aircraft to meet the new conditions. The Model EC-2 was powered by an Aeronca 30 hp (22 kW) E-107A engine. It did not go into production and the lone prototype crashed years later when a student stalled it with an instructor.  As a first step in the project, a single-seat version the Model EC-1 was developed as an ongoing evolution of the Cessna CG-2 Primary Glider, using small engines.

The record keeping of Cessna is confused, as far as the question of more than one of the EC-2 being produced.  Photographic evidence so far indicates only one was produced, N403W. The plane has picked up the nickname "the Baby Cessna."  The color was red with a creme side stripe.

See also

References

EC-2
Single-engined tractor aircraft
High-wing aircraft
1930s United States civil utility aircraft